The Kott people were a Yeniseian-speaking people in Siberia. They were closely related to the Asan people (who are also extinct). They spoke the Kott language which went extinct in the mid-1800s along with the ethnicity.

Dené–Yeniseian connection

For a long time there have been efforts to link the Yeniseian and the Na–Dené people group of North America. In 2008, Edward Vajda of Western Washington University presented evidence for a genealogical relation between the Yeneisian languages of Siberia and the Na–Dené languages of North America. At the time of publication (2010), Vajda's proposals had been favorably reviewed by several specialists of Na-Dené and Yeniseian languages—although at times with caution—including Michael Krauss, Jeff Leer, James Kari, and Heinrich Werner, as well as a number of other respected linguists, such as Bernard Comrie, Johanna Nichols, Victor Golla, Michael Fortescue, Eric Hamp, and Bill Poser (Kari and Potter 2010:12). One significant exception is the critical review of the volume of collected papers by Lyle Campbell and a response by Vajda published in late 2011 that clearly indicate the proposal is not completely settled at the present time. Two other reviews and notices of the volume appeared in 2011 by Keren Rice and Jared Diamond.

See also
 Demographics of Siberia
 Indigenous peoples of Siberia
 Lists of indigenous peoples of Russia
 Yeniseian people
 Ket people

References

Ethnic groups in Russia
Ethnic groups in Siberia
Indigenous peoples of North Asia